R. C. Hörsch (also R. C. Horsch or Raymond Charles Hoersch) (born 1943) is an American photographer, filmmaker, writer, sculptor and musician known for controversial work that blurs the distinction between art and pornography. He is known for his sociopathic tendencies and sado-masochistic lifestyle. His 50-year body of work ranges from  poetic to explicit. He is cited academically, along with Hans Bellmer and Robert Mapplethorpe, as an example of an artist of transgressive work. Criticism of his work both praises his authenticity, sensitivity and masterful technique and condemns the exploitation of his subjects

Birth
Official records list his birth name as Raymond Charles Hoersch and his birth date as 5 May 1943 in East Stroudsburg, Pennsylvania. However, baptismal and U.S. Department of Justice records place the year as early as 1933.

Criminal history
During the Vietnam era, Hörsch was a draft dodger and army deserter who was granted amnesty and later pardoned under mass issuances of such by Gerald Ford in 1974 and Jimmy Carter in 1977. His criminal history includes multiple counts of forgery (1972-1975), counterfeiting (1974), manufacturing controlled substance (1977), fugitive from justice (1977-1984), assault of security officer(s) (1997) and large-scale growing of marijuana (2009). He was suspected of (but never charged with) the smuggling of large amounts of marijuana into the United States from Mexico (1967-1971) and the wholesale manufacture of chemically pure methamphetamine (1977-1979). Charges of simple assault (2001), theft (2003) and sexual offenses (2009) were dismissed or nol prossed. He served three Federal prison sentences: 1975–1976, 1984–1989 and 2009–2013. He was released from custody on June 23, 2013.

Psychological history
Hörsch has been tested with a Stanford-Binet range of 145–160. Psychological and psychiatric evaluations conducted by the United States Third District Federal Court in 1985 diagnosed bipolar disorder, severe clinical depression and characterological disorder with sociopathic, paranoid and active schizophrenic psychosis features.

Career
In the 1960s, after briefly trying marriage and pursuits in engineering and computer science, Hörsch began working in film and became known for his expertise in directing small children for television commercials. Simultaneously, he started a career as a still photographer but supplemented his income as an art forger specializing in Picasso etchings. Then, when his Vietnam era draft deferments ran out in 1968, he began a seven-year stint as an army deserter. For several years during this decade, he fed both his love of airplanes and his adrenaline addiction by flying bales of marijuana into the U.S. from Mexico. On a freelance basis, he made many live action clips for the Children's Television Workshop ("Sesame Street") during its pioneering first year (1969) but he is perhaps best known for his magazine photo layouts which juxtaposed high fashion models and "skid row" escorts.

In the early 1970s he directed television commercials in addition to producing and directing theatrical pornographic films like the 1973 The Erotic Memoirs of a Male Chauvinist Pig, which starred Georgina Spelvin. Also during this period, he began a career as a porn performer by doubling for Harry Reems after a "splash" (ejaculation) shot was lost to a camera film jam. This career continued until 2006 with regular appearances in Pleasure Productions' Streets of New York and Taxi Tales public sex series and other films.
 
Counterfeiting $10 bills landed him in Federal prison in 1974. Then in 1976, an indictment for the manufacture of Federally controlled substances marked the beginning of eight years as an international fugitive. He lived mostly in New Zealand and Australia during these years but somehow managed to fly a Bede BD-5 micro-jet aircraft in various U.S. air shows, appearing on ABC's Wide World of Sports during the 1980 Reno Air Races.

His artistic career resumed shortly after completing his second Federal prison term and then, beginning in the 1990s, his work began attracting attention with major one-man exhibitions in New York, Rome, Las Vegas and Los Angeles.

In 1993, he produced and directed a series of erotic documentaries titled Lovers: an Intimate Portrait for Candida Royalle's woman-owned Femme Distribution Company. In 2003, he completed Slaves, a quasi-documentary about artistic obsession, dysfunction, sexual abuse and degradation. In 2006, he finished Snuff!, an experimental film project about a psychopathic killer and his victim. In 2008, he finished Nina, a feature documentary about political activist and porn star Nina Hartley and the emerging pro-sex feminist movement.

In 2009, as his artistic career was gaining momentum, he was again arrested, this time for manufacturing of a controlled Substance and attempt to sell, and served another four years in Federal prison.

He was released in June 2013, then published three novels and a collection of short stories and continuing his 15-year photographic exploration of heroin-addicted prostitutes. A two-part minimalist exhibition of approximately 200 of these images was presented June 2014 in Philadelphia. His Deleted Scenes, a psychological horror film, was completed in 2016. In March 2018, he completed Whore!, a documentary about an intelligent, articulate, suicidal, drug-addicted prostitute.

Feature films
The Erotic Memoir of Edmund Bernard Satterthwaite, IV; A Male Chauvinist Pig, Cinema Menteur, 1973, released by Mature Films Enterrprises, 1973, re-mastered and re-released 2013 by Distribpix, Inc.
Miss Terry Takes a Liberty, Cinema Menteur, 1973, released by Mature Films Enterprises, 1974
Lovers, an intimate Portrait, vol 1: Sydney and Ray, Cinema Menteur, 1994, released by Femme Distribution, Inc., 1994
Lovers, an Intimate Portrait, vol 2: Jennifer and Steve, Cinema Menteur, 1994, released by Femme Distribution, Inc., 1994
Slaves, Cinema Menteur, 2003, released by IMC / Eroto~, 2003
Snuff!, Cinema Menteur, 2006, released by IMC / Eroto~, 2006
Nina, Cinema Menteur, 1998–2008, released by IMC / Eroto~ 2008
Deleted Scenes, a serial killer's video journal, Cinema Menteur, 2004–2016, released by IMC / Eroto~ 2016
Whore, an intimate and intense portrait of a marginalized human being, Cinema Meteur, 2018, released by IMC / Eroto~ 2018
Transgressions, an unusual love story, Cinema Meteur, 2022, released by IMC / Eroto~ 2022

Major exhibitions
Sex, Neikrug Photografika, 224 E 68th Street, 10021, Wed-Sat 1–5, Sept
To the Prurient Interest, Las Vegas, Nevada, 2004, Los Angeles, California, 2004
Body and Mind, Los Angeles, California (2005), Rome, 2005
Retrospective, Philadelphia, Pennsylvania, 2014
Transgressions, Philadelphia, Pennsylvania, 2014

Books
The Home and Farm Manual for the Production of Alcohol Fuels, Stephen W. Mathewson (pen name), 10-Speed Press,  Berkeley, California, First edition January 1, 1980, 
Eroto~ To the Prurient Interest, vol. 1, R.C. Hörsch, IMC/Eroto~, Philadelphia, Pennsylvania, 1st edition August 1, 2003, 
Eroto~ To the Prurient Interest, vol. 2, R.C. Hörsch, IMC/Eroto~, Philadelphia, Pennsylvania, 1st edition August 1, 2003, 
Empathy: The Memoir of an Empathetic Serial Killer,''' R.C. Hörsch, IMC/Eroto~, Philadelphia, Pennsylvania,  1st edition Mar 3, 2014, Annie, R.C. Hörsch and M. Anna Ferkuniak, IMC/Eroto~, Philadelphia, Pennsylvania,  1st edition Mar 3, 2014,  Transgressions, R.C. Hörsch, IMC/Eroto~, Philadelphia, Pennsylvania, 1st edition Mar 3, 2014,  Slaves, R.C. Hörsch, IMC/Eroto~, Philadelphia, Pennsylvania, 1st edition Mar 3, 2014,  

 Anthologies The Mammouth Book of Erotic Photography,  Maxim Jakubowski (editor), Running Press; Fourth Edition (October 1, 2013), The Mammouth Book of Erotic Women, Maxim Jakubowski (editor),  Running Press; 1ST edition (October 19, 2005), Photo Sex, David Steinberg (editor), Down There Press, San Francisco, 2003, Sex in the City — An Illustrated History'', by Alison Maddox with foreword by Camille Paglia, Rizzoli Universe Publishing (February 14, 2006),

References

External links
Website devoted to Hörsch's work
General commentary, 2008
Controversial London tabloid interview, 2006

1943 births
Living people
American erotic artists
American erotic photographers
Social documentary photographers
American portrait photographers
American erotica writers
American fiction writers
American film directors
American pornographic film directors
American pornographic film producers
American male pornographic film actors